Political Science is a triannual peer-reviewed academic journal covering political science. It was established at Victoria University of Wellington in 1948 and remains New Zealand's sole professional journal of political science. It is published by Taylor and Francis and has a broadly comparative or international approach, with a particular focus on the Asia-Pacific region.

Abstracting and indexing 
The journal is abstracted and indexed in Current Contents, International Bibliography of the Social Sciences, and the Social Sciences Citation Index. According to the Journal Citation Reports, its 2013 impact factor is 0.700, ranking it 75th out of 156 journals in the category "Political Science".

References

External links 
 

Political science journals
Taylor & Francis academic journals
Publications established in 1948
English-language journals
Triannual journals